Itami City Museum of Insects (Japanese: 伊丹市昆虫館, Itami-shi konchūkan) is an insectarium in Itami, Hyogo Prefecture, Japan.

History 

The museum opened in 1990 to commemorate the 50th anniversary of Itami City. Initially, the Itami Park Greenery Association managed the facility, but the association was dissolved at the end of March 2013 and the museum moved under the management of Itami City, and is managed by Itami City Cultural Promotion Foundation. The first museum director was Azusa Tanaka, and since April 2012, Kiyoichi Okuyama.

Itami City Insectarium Friends' Association is an organization that helps the experience at the museum to be enjoyable. Upon presenting a "clover card" issued to preschoolers and elementary and junior high school students residing in municipalities of Itami, Takarazuka, Kawanishi, Sanda, and Inagawa-cho, children could enter the museum free of charge. However, the clover card was abolished at the end of March 2014.

In 2006, the museum was one of the organizers of the Singing insects and Gocho event that began in Itami.

In 2011, the museum carried out restoration work on insect specimens held by the Rikuzentakata City Museum in Iwate Prefecture, which were damaged in the 2011 Tōhoku earthquake and tsunami.

Insectarium 
Floor 1

 Butterfly greenhouse
 Ecological exhibition room
 Exhibition room 1
 Video hall
 Special exhibition room

Floor 2

 Study room
 Exhibition room 2

Butterfly greenhouse 
The dome-shaped butterfly greenhouse houses a total of about 1,000 butterflies from 14 different species living in Itami and Okinawa. Below are some of the butterfly species found at the museum.

References 

Insectariums
Butterfly houses
Museums in Hyōgo Prefecture
1990 establishments in Japan
Museums established in 1990
Natural history museums in Japan
Itami, Hyōgo